Robert Mitchell (born August 10, 1949) is an American sprint canoer who competed in the early 1970s. At the 1972 Summer Olympics in Munich, he was eliminated in the repechages of the K-1 1000 m event.

References
Sports-reference.com profile

1949 births
American male canoeists
Canoeists at the 1972 Summer Olympics
Living people
Olympic canoeists of the United States
Place of birth missing (living people)